Prosenjakovci is a village in the Municipality of Moravske Toplice in the Prekmurje region of Slovenia, close to the border with Hungary.

Unmarked grave
Prosenjakovci is the site of an unmarked grave associated with the Second World War or its aftermath. The Prosenjakovci Grave lies southwest of the village, behind the funeral chapel in the village cemetery. It contains the remains of a Hungarian that was shot while crossing the border illegally.

Churches

There are two small churches in the settlement, a Catholic chapel dedicated to Saint Joseph and a Lutheran chapel with a three-storey belfry, built in 1927.

References

External links

Prosenjakovci on Geopedia

Populated places in the Municipality of Moravske Toplice